Monticomorpha is a genus of striped walkingsticks in the family Pseudophasmatidae. There are 8 described species in Monticomorpha.

Species
These 8 species belong to the genus Monticomorpha:

 Monticomorpha affinis (Shelford, 1913)
 Monticomorpha bispinosa Conle & Hennemann, 2002
 Monticomorpha boyaca (Conle, Hennemann & Gutiérrez, 2011)
 Monticomorpha flavolimbata (Redtenbacher, 1906)
 Monticomorpha marshallae Conle & Hennemann, 2002
 Monticomorpha roulinii (Goudot, 1843)
 Monticomorpha semele (Westwood, 1859)
 Monticomorpha unicolor (Haan, 1842)

References

Phasmatodea genera